Franz-Josef Weber (born 14 March 1952) is an Austrian biathlete. He competed at the 1976 Winter Olympics and the 1980 Winter Olympics.

References

1952 births
Living people
Austrian male biathletes
Olympic biathletes of Austria
Biathletes at the 1976 Winter Olympics
Biathletes at the 1980 Winter Olympics
People from Ried im Innkreis District
Sportspeople from Upper Austria